Lac de Biscarrosse et de Parentis is a lake in Landes, France. At an elevation of 19 m, its surface area is 35.4 km².

Biscarrosse Et De Parentis
Landforms of Landes (department)